

See also

Construction of Queensland railways

References

Railway tunnels in Queensland
Queensland transport-related lists
Lists of buildings and structures in Queensland